Farid (Arabic: فَرِيد fariyd, farīd), also spelt Fareed or Ferid and accented Férid, is an Arabic and Persian masculine personal name or surname meaning "unique, singular ("the One"), incomparable". For many communities, including in the Middle East, the Balkans, North Africa, and South East Asia, the name Fareed is common across generations.

Given name

Farid 
Farid Abboud, Lebanese Ambassador
Farid F. Abraham, scientist
Farid Alakbarli, Azerbaijani researcher
Farid Azarkan (born 1971), Dutch politician of Moroccan descent
Farid al-Atrash (1910-1974), Syrian Egyptian singer, music composer, and actor
Farid ad-Din Attar, Iranian Sufi poet
Farid Bang (born Farid Hamed El Abdellaoui in 1986), German rapper of Moroccan-Spanish descent
Farid Yu Darvishsefat, Japanese baseball player of Iranian descent
Farid Esack, South African anti-apartheid activist and Muslim scholar
Fariduddin Ganjshakar, 12th-century Punjabi Muslim mystic
Farid Ghadry, Syrian political activist
Farid Kamil, Malaysian male model turned actor
Farid Khan, birth name of Sher Shah Suri, king of the Sur Empire in present-day India
Farid Mansurov, Azerbaijani wrestler
Farid Mukhametshin, Tatarstani politician
Farid Shawki, Egyptian actor
Farid Stino, Middle Eastern businessman
Farid Suleman, American businessman
Farid Talhaoui, Moroccan football player

Fahrid
Fahrid Murray Abraham, actor

Fareed
Fareed Ahmad (cricketer) (born 1994), Afghan cricketer
Fareed Ahmad (field hockey) (born 1989), Pakistani field hockey player
Fareed Ahmed (born 1989), Pakistani field hockey player
Fareed Ayaz, Pakistani qawwal
Fareed Ebrahim (born 1998), Egyptian born Qatari footballer
Fareed Haque, American jazz guitarist
Fareed Lafta, Iraqi pilot and athlete
Fareed Majeed (born 1986), Iraqi footballer
Fareed Parbati (1961-2011), Indian Urdu language poet and writer
Fareed Sadat (born 1998), Afghan footballer
Fareed Zakaria (born 1964), American journalist and commentator
Fareed Zargar, Afghan cricketer
Farid al-Atrash, Famous arabic singer

Ferid
Ferid Berberi (born 1946), Albanian sportsman and weightlifter
Férid Boughedir (born 1944), Tunisian film director and screenwriter
Ferid Chouchane (born 1973), Tunisian footballer
Ferid Džanić (1918–1943), Bosniak soldier during World War II
Ferid Idrizović (born 1982), Bosnian-Herzegovinian footballer
Ferid Imam, Ethiopian-born Canadian citizen who is believed to have provided military training to al Qaeda jihadists in Pakistan
Ferid Matri, Swiss-Tunisian-Italian footballer
Ferid Muhić (born 1943), Bosnoan-Herzegovinian administrator and President of the Bosniak Academy of Sciences and Arts
Ferid Murad (born 1936), Albanian physician and pharmacologist, co-winner of the 1998 Nobel Prize in Physiology or Medicine.
Ferid Radeljaš (born 1959), Bosnian-Herzegovinian footballer
Ferid Rragami (born 1957), Albanian footballer

Middle name

Fareed
Ibrahim Fareed Didi, a prince, son of Sultan Abdul Majeed Didi and Princess consort Famuladeyrige Didi and the brother of King Muhammad Fareed Didi of Maldives.
Muhammad Fareed Didi (1901–1969), a king. Son of the Sultan Prince Abdul Majeed Didi was the last Sultan of Maldives and the first Maldivian monarch to assume the title of King

Ferid
Damat Ferid Pasha (1853–1923), Ottoman liberal statesman, who held the office of Grand Vizier, the de facto prime minister of the Ottoman Empire
Mehmed Ferid Pasha (1851-1914), Ottoman statesman of ethnic Albanian background. He served as Grand Vizier of the Ottoman Empire (1903-1908)

Surname

Farid
Baba Farid or Fariduddin Ganjshakar, Punjabi Sufi saint
Ibn al-Farid, Arab poet
Jasmin Farid (born 1992), Swedish politician
Khwaja Ghulam Farid, Siraiki poet
Mariam Mamdouh Farid (born 1998), Qatari athlete
Mohammad Farid, Egyptian politician

Fareed
Ahmed Fareed, American studio host and sports reporter 
Kamaal Ibn John Fareed, American rapper also known as Q-Tip
Donald Fareed, Iranian born American Christian tele-evangelist
Kamaal Fareed (born 1970), American rapper, record producer, singer, actor and DJ better known as Q-Tip and also The Abstract
Morad Fareed (born 1979), Palestinian-American entrepreneur
Muneer Fareed (born 1956), Muslim scholar and the former secretary general of ISNA (Islamic Society of North America)
Vala Fareed (born 1975),Iraqi-Kurdish politician, Minister of State for the Kurdistan Region of Iraq and previously the first female speaker of the legislature

Faried
Kenneth Faried, American professional basketball player

Fictional
Farid, character in the book Inkheart by Cornelia Funke
Ferid Egan, Commander of the Queen's Knights in the video game Suikoden V
Farid, character in the game Call of Duty: Black Ops II
Ferid Bathory, character in the manga Owari no Seraph
Farid, character in the book The Kite Runner

See also
Farida (given name), the feminine form of the name

References

Arabic masculine given names
Arabic-language surnames
Bosniak masculine given names
Persian masculine given names
Pakistani masculine given names